Robert John Darrell Newhouse (11 May 1911 – 27 November 2000) was an  Anglican priest. He was the Archdeacon of Totnes from 1966 to 1976.

Newhouse was educated at Worcester College, Oxford, and  ordained in 1945. He held curacies at St John's Peterborough and St Giles's Cambridge before World War II service with the RNVR.  After the war he was Rector of Ashwater and Rural Dean of Holsworthy before becoming Vicar of Littleham-cum-Exmouth and Rural Dean of Aylesbeare before his archdeacon’s appointment.

References

1911 births
Alumni of Worcester College, Oxford
Royal Naval Volunteer Reserve personnel of World War II
Archdeacons of Totnes
2000 deaths